Lierne may refer to:

Lierne, municipality of Norway
Lierne (vault), architectural term for an element of a vault